The Williamsburg-James City County Public Schools (locally known also as WJCC or WJC) is a combined public school division which serves the independent city of Williamsburg and James City County in the Virginia Peninsula area of the Hampton Roads region in southeastern Virginia.

The system consists of approximately 11,000 students in 15 schools, of which there are 9 elementary schools, 3 middle schools, and 3 high schools.  The system employs 800 instructional staff members and over 600 support staff members.

James River Elementary School, located in the Grove Community in the county's southeastern end, is a magnet school. It offers the IB Primary Years Programme, one of only five such schools Virginia as of October, 2006. 

Clara Byrd Baker, a public elementary school in Williamsburg, was opened in September 1989.  Originally built to house 600 students, it  was expanded in 1992 to increase its capacity to 800 students.

The three high schools, all of which are within the county's borders (though they have Williamsburg addresses), are Jamestown, Lafayette, and Warhill High Schools. All are considered above average institutions. For the 2001–2002 academic year, the public school system was ranked among the top five school systems in the Commonwealth of Virginia and in the top 15% nationwide by Expansion Management Magazine. There are also two regional Governor's Schools in the area that serve gifted and talented students.

A new middle school and a ninth elementary school were opened and began operating in September 2010, at the start of the 2010–11 school year.

History

The district formed in the mid-1950s when the city and county systems combined.

The Williamsburg-James City County Public Schools system (known informally as "WJCC"), as of 2020, has approximately 11,300 students in 16 schools—9 elementary schools, 4 middle schools, and 3 high schools. Within the county's boundaries there are two established high schools, Lafayette, and Jamestown. A third high school, Warhill, opened in the Lightfoot area in August 2007. The ninth elementary school, JB Blayton, opened in 2010 along with the new middle school to replace James Blair, Lois S. Hornsby Middle School. In 2018, James Blair Middle School opened, to be the most recent school to open in the WJCC Schools district.

Governance
The school board has seven members, with two from Williamsburg and the others from James City County.

Demographics
As of circa 2015, of the 11,000 students, about 1,100 (about 10%) live in Williamsburg and the remainder are in James City County.

Schools

High schools
All high schools hold students in grades 9–12.
Jamestown High School
Lafayette High School
Warhill High School

Middle schools
All middle schools hold students in grades 6–8.
Berkeley Middle School (Williamsburg)
James Blair Middle School (Williamsburg)
Toano Middle School
Lois S. Hornsby Middle School

Elementary schools
All elementary schools hold students in grades K–5.
Clara Byrd Baker Elementary School
J. Blaine Blayton Elementary School
James River Elementary School
Located in the Grove Community in the county's southeastern end, James River is a magnet school. It offers the International Baccalaureate Primary Years Programme, one of only five such schools Virginia to do so.
Laurel Lane Elementary School
Matoaka Elementary School
D.J. Montague Elementary School
Norge Elementary School
Stonehouse Elementary School
Matthew Whaley Elementary School (Williamsburg)

Changes for 2010–11 school year
As of the 2010–11 school year, a new 9th elementary and a new middle school (replacing James Blair Middle School) opened. Although planned to operate separately, the two schools are adjacently-located off Jolly Pond Road near the present county school bus garage.

The new schools were formally dedicated on October 2, 2010. An audience of close to 100 people joined the school board, members of the James City County Board of Supervisors and Williamsburg City Council and the families of the namesakes for the ceremony. The new schools are:

 J. Blaine Blayton Elementary School, named in honor of Dr. J. Blaine Blayton, an African American physician and civic leader who lived in the Grove community in James City County. Dr. Blayton was a supporter of public education and the first African American to serve on the James City County school board. His son, Oscar, was the first African American to attend the College of William and Mary.  
 Lois S Hornsby Middle School, named for Mrs. Lois Hornsby, a philanthropist who has lived in Williamsburg for more than five decades. Ms. Hornsby is the mother of musician Bruce Hornsby and widow of lawyer and real estate developer Robert Hornsby, Sr.

The newest middle school, Hornsby, will effectively replace James Blair Middle School. The Blair complex was originally built as a high school, and is one of the school division's older structures. For the 2010–11 school year and the immediate future, the division plans to operate only 3 middle schools, although a newer portion of the Blair complex is scheduled to be modified to accommodate the Academy for Life & Learning, an alternative education program for older students. The school system's central administration will utilize the larger, remaining portion of Blair for its offices. While current facilities will be adequate to meet most of the system's needs, a future renovation of the Blair complex for reuse as a middle school is anticipated, possibly by 2017.

New school for 2017–2018 school year

In 2017 a new middle school will be built on the James Blair site, with plans to be opened in fall 2018. The WJCC School Board accepted a proposal by the Superintendent on October 21, 2014.  The proposal includes two phases.  In the first phase, a new building will be constructed beside the current James Blair school building.  In the second phase, the old building will be demolished and a new building will be constructed in its place.  The final project will cost around $40 million and house around 900 students.

References

External links
 Williamsburg-James City County Public Schools Official Website
 

School divisions in Virginia
Education in Williamsburg, Virginia
Education in James City County, Virginia